Brynard Stander is a South African rugby union player, currently playing in Australia with the Western Force. His usual position is flanker.

Super Rugby statistics

References

1990 births
South African rugby union players
Sharks (Currie Cup) players
Rugby union flankers
Rugby union players from Durban
Living people
Western Force players
Expatriate rugby union players in Australia
South African expatriates in Australia
Perth Spirit players
Rugby union number eights